Philip of Sweden may refer to:

Philip of Sweden, King of Sweden 1105
Philip, prince (died after 1200), son of King Eric IX of Sweden
Philip, prince (died 1251), son of King Canute II of Sweden

See also
Carl Philip of Sweden (disambiguation)